Gandalf were an American psychedelic rock band formed in 1965 in New York City. Originally called the Rahgoos, the group consisted of guitarist Peter Sando, bassist Bob Muller, keyboardist Frank Hubach and drummer Davy Bauer.

They signed a recording contract with Capitol Records in 1967. Producers Koppelman & Rubin were not happy with the band's name, and suggested that it should be changed to the Knockrockers. However Peter Sando commented that they "hated that and bantered about various names". Despite being against the band's will, and losing local fan recognition, Davy suggested the name "Gandalf and The Wizards", which ended up sticking as "Gandalf".

They recorded their first LP the same year. The record includes covers of Tim Hardin, Eden Ahbez and Bonner & Gordon (the writers of "Happy Together") and two songs composed by the band's guitarist Peter Sando. But Capitol spurned them and only released the LP in 1969 with the wrong record inside the sleeve. The copies were recalled and damaged the band's career. Capitol didn't promote the record which made the sales worse. Over the years the album's reputation grew and it was re-released by Sundazed records in 2002. A second album, "2," was released by Sundazed in 2007.

Band members
 Peter Sando - guitar
 Frank Hubach - keyboards
 Bob Muller - bass guitar
 Davy Bauer - drums

Discography 
 Gandalf (1969)
 "Golden Earrings" (Ray Evans/Jay Livingston/Victor Young cover)
 "Hang On To A Dream" (Tim Hardin cover)
 "Never Too Far" (Hardin)
 "Scarlet Ribbons" (Evelyn Danzig/Jack Segal cover)
 "You Upset The Grace Of Living" (Hardin)
 "Can You Travel In The Dark Alone" (Peter Sando)
 "Nature Boy" (Eden Ahbez cover)
 "Tiffany Rings" (Garry Bonner/Alan Gordon cover)
 "Me About You" (Bonner/Gordon)
 "I Watch The Moon" (Sando)

References

The Mojo Collection by Jimmy Irvin and Colin McLear, London, 2000, Canongate Press.

External links
Ugly Things talks to Pete Sando about The Rahgoos and Gandalf

1965 establishments in New York City
1968 disestablishments in New York (state)
Musical groups disestablished in 1968
Musical groups established in 1965
Psychedelic pop music groups
Psychedelic rock music groups from New York (state)
Musical groups from New York City